This page records the details of the matches played by the Japan national football team during 2009. In 2009 the Japan national football team competed in the fourth round of the AFC 2010 FIFA World Cup qualifications, the 2011 AFC Asian Cup qualification, and the 2009 Kirin Cup, amongst other friendly matches.

Schedule

Players statistics

Top goal scorers for 2009

Kits
Japan's kits until October.

Japan's kit used on November.

Coach
Takeshi Okada was in charge for the whole year.

References

External links
Japan Football Association

Japan national football team results
2009 in Japanese football
Japan